MasterChef Junior Albania was an Albanian competitive cooking game show. It is an adaptation of the Australian show Junior MasterChef Australia. It is a spin-off of MasterChef Albania, itself an adaptation of the British show MasterChef, and features contestants aged 8 to 14.

The first season premiered on 27 March 2018. The judges were Sokol Prenga, Xheraldina Vula and Julian Zguro

1st season: 2018

Top 16

Elimination table

References 

2018 Albanian television series debuts
2018 Albanian television series endings
2018 Albanian television seasons
Albanian reality television series
Greece Junior
Non-British television series based on British television series
Television series about children
Television series about teenagers
RTSH original programming